Neogurelca mulleri is a moth of the  family Sphingidae. It is known from Mexico.

References

Neogurelca
Moths described in 1923